Hans Jürgen "Hansi" Kürsch (born 10 August 1966) is a German singer, songwriter and former bass guitarist, best known as a member of the power metal band Blind Guardian. One of the founders of the band, he has been its lead vocalist since its creation in 1984, and also acted as the band's bass guitarist until 1996.

He is also the former lead vocalist of Demons & Wizards, a side-project with Iced Earth guitarist Jon Schaffer until his departure from the project in 2021. Additionally, he has worked prominently as a guest with other artists, including Angra, Edguy, Iced Earth, and Therion; he notably played characters in the Ayreon albums 01011001 and The Source.

Early life
Hansi Kürsch was born on 10 August 1966 in Lank-Latum, near Düsseldorf, to a working-class family in West Germany. He is the youngest of four siblings.

Kürsch was raised in the suburb of Lank-Latum, near a castle called Burg Linn. Having spent his childhood playing football near the castle nurtured his love and passion both for football, as well as fantasy and fairytales, which later became the main source for his lyrics. 

By the time he was ten, Kürsch discovered his love for music, specifically Classic Rock bands, such as the Electric Light Orchestra, Genesis or Queen. However, the turning point for him was coming across Deep Purple’s 24 Carat Purple for the first time, which not only started his love for Hard Rock music, but also introduced him to bands like The Who, Led Zeppelin, and others. He lists Ian Gillan, Freddie Mercury, and Peter Gabriel as his favorite singers, and the ones who influenced him the most.

Personal life
In 1984, while being a Commerce School student, and on the same day Kürsch met his current bandmate and Blind Guardian cofounder, André Olbrich, he became aware of a female student called Andrea, whom he later married in 1991. Their son, Jonas, was born in 2001. Together with his wife and son, Kürsch still now resides in Krefeld.

History
A signature of Kürsch's songwriting is his practice of overdubbing his own voice multiple times in complex, overlapping harmonies on his recordings, creating the atmosphere of a huge choir.  The track "Chant" on the first Demons & Wizards album is vocal only, in the style of a traditional Gregorian chant; Kürsch's is the only voice on the song.

Kürsch's lyrics revolve around various themes prevalent in the power metal genre, including medieval fantasy, J. R. R. Tolkien, religious/mythological tales, and legends/stories, both his own and from the literary world. His lyrics in the first Demons & Wizards album tackle even various themes, whereas "Touched by the Crimson King" was based primarily off different fantasy novels.
 
Kürsch had also recorded three albums for his side project with Jon Schaffer of Iced Earth, Demons & Wizards until his departure in 2021.

Demons & Wizards – Demons & Wizards (2000)
Demons & Wizards – Touched by the Crimson King (2005)
Demons & Wizards – III (2020)

Although mostly known for being a clean singer nowadays, Kürsch's early technique made use of a harsher, "screaming" technique. He can be heard using similar, more aggressive, technique while singing guest vocals for Heaven Shall Burn's cover of "Valhalla".

Guest appearances

Provided lead vocals, unless stated otherwise.
Gamma Ray: Land of the Free – "Farewell" (1995)
Grave Digger: Tunes of War – backing vocals on all tracks (1996)
Iron Savior: Iron Savior – "For the World" (1997)
Nepal: Manifiesto  – "Besando La Tierra", "Estadio Chico" (1997)
Edguy: Vain Glory Opera – "Out of Control", "Vain Glory Opera" (1998)
Grave Digger: Excalibur – backing vocals on all tracks (1999)
Therion: Deggial (2000) – "Flesh of the Gods" (2000)
Rage: Unity – backing vocals on all tracks (2002)
Angra: Temple of Shadows – "Winds of Destination" (2004)
Nuclear Blast: Nuclear Blast All-Stars: Into the Light – "Slaves to the Desert" (2007)
Aneurysm: Shades – "Reflection" (2007)
Ayreon: 0101100101011001 – portrayed as Forever (represented by a Celtic cross symbol) in "Age of Shadows", "Beneath the Waves", "Newborn Race", "The Fifth Extinction", "Unnatural Selection", "River of Time", "The Sixth Extinction" (2008)
Dreamtone & Iris Mavraki's Neverland: Reversing Time – "To Lose the Sun" (2008)
Van Canto: Hero – "Take to the Sky" (2008)
The Arrow: Lady Nite – "Never Say Never" (2009)
Rage: Strings to a Web Bonus DVD (Live at Wacken Open Air 2009) – "Set This World on Fire", "All I Want", "Invisible Horizons" (2010)
Grave Digger: The Ballad of Mary – Rebellion 2010 (2011, EP)
Grave Digger: The Clans Are Still Marching (2011) – "Rebellion (The Clans Are Marching)" (2011, live album)
Solar Fragment: In Our Hands – Inside the Circle (2011)
Maegi: Skies Fall – "Those We've Left Behind" (2013)
Heaven Shall Burn: Veto – "Valhalla" (2013)
Iced Earth: Plagues of Babylon – "Among the Living Dead" (2014)
The Unguided: Fragile Immortality – "Deathwalker" (2014) 
Disforia: The Age of Ether – "The Dying Firmament" (2014)
Vexillum: Unum – "The Sentenced: Fire and Blood" (2015)
Doro: Strong and Proud: 30 Years of Rock and Metal – "Rock Till Death" (2016, live album) 
In Extremo: Quid Pro Quo – "Roter Stern" (2016)
Hansen & Friends: XXX - Three Decades in Metal – "Follow the Sun" (2016)
The Dwarves OST: "Children of the Smith" (2016)
Ayreon: The Source – portrayed The Astronomer in "The Day That the World Breaks Down", "Everybody Dies", "Star of Sirrah", "Run! Apocalypse! Run!", "Aquatic Race", "Into the Ocean", "Planet Y Is Alive!", "Journey to Forever", "The Human Compulsion" (2017)
Tarja: Feliz Navidad – "Feliz Navidad (Barbuda Relief and Recovery Charity version)" (2017, single)
Orphaned Land: Unsung Prophets & Dead Messiahs – "Like Orpheus" (2018)
Ayreon: Ayreon Universe – The Best of Ayreon Live – "River of Time", "Star of Sirrah", "Age of Shadows", "Everybody Dies", "The Eye of Ra" (2018, live album)
Judicator: The Last Emperor – "Spiritual Treason" (2018)
ZiX: Rise from your Ashes your Grave – "Rise from your Ashes your Grave" (2018)
Avantasia: Moonglow – "Book of Shallows", "The Raven Child" (2019)
Hämatom: "I Want It All" (2019, single)
Diamond Kobra: The Arrival – narrator of Intro & Outro (2019)
Númenor: Draconian Age – "Make the Stand (At the Gates of Erebor)" (2021)
Corvus Corax: Era Metallum – "Lá í mbealtaine" (2022)
Powerwolf: "Call of the Wild" (2022, single)
Stranger Vision: Wasteland – "Wasteland" (2022)

References

External links

Interview with Hansi at Nocturnal Horde (16 July 2005)
Blind Guardian website
Demons & Wizards website

1966 births
Living people
People from Rhein-Kreis Neuss
Blind Guardian members
German heavy metal bass guitarists
Male bass guitarists
German heavy metal singers
German male singers
English-language singers from Germany
Demons & Wizards (band) members
German male guitarists